Ann Heinson is an American high-energy particle physicist known for her work on single top quark physics.  She established and lead the DØ Single Top Group which first published experimental observations of the top quark, and in 1997 she co-authored a paper which laid the foundations for further investigation into the top quark.

Early life and education
Heinson grew up in Billericay, S.E. England.  She earned both her B.Sc. in Physics (1984) and Ph.D. in High Energy Physics (1988, advisor Peter Dornan) from Imperial College.

Career and research
Heinson worked for the BBC's engineering research department before emigrating to California in 1989.  There, she worked as a postdoctoral researcher at UC Irvine on a rare kaon decay experiment E791 at Brookhaven National Laboratory.  In 1992, she began working on the Dø collaboration at Fermi National Accelerator Laboratory.  She established and lead the Dø Single Top working group from 1995 to 2009.  In 1997, she co-authored the paper "Single Top Quarks at the Fermilab Tevatron," which laid the conceptual foundations for the next decade of top quark experimental research. Under her leadership, the single top working group discovered the first evidence of single top quark production at Fermi labs Tevatron.  She retired in 2012.

Honors and awards
 American Physical Society's Woman Physicist of the Month (July 2012)
 Fellow of the American Association for the Advancement of Science (December 2010)
 Fellow of the American Physical Society (November 2008)
 UC Riverside Distinguished Researcher Award for Non-Senate Faculty (September 2002)

References

American women physicists
British emigrants to the United States
Particle physicists
British physicists
21st-century American physicists
Alumni of Imperial College London
Living people
Year of birth missing (living people)
People from Billericay
21st-century American women scientists
Fellows of the American Physical Society